West Nias Regency (Indonesian: Kabupaten Nias Barat) is a regency in North Sumatra province of Indonesia. The regency seat is Lahomi. It covers the western portion of Nias Island. The Regency covers an area of 520.34 km2, and had a population of 81,807 at the 2010 Census and 89,994 at the 2020 Census. The official estimate as at mid 2021 was 90,585. This regency was founded in 2008 by UU (Law) No.46 Tahun (Year) 2008; formerly, the area was part of Nias Regency.

Borders 
West Nias Regency is bordered by:
 North: North Nias Regency (Tugala Oyo District) and Nias Regency (Botomuzoi and Hili Serangkai Districts);
 East: Nias Regency (Gido and Ma'u Districts);
 South: South Nias Regency (various districts);
 West: Indian Sea.

Administration
The regency is divided into eight districts (kecamatan), tabulated below with their areas (in km2) and their populations at the 2010 Census  and the 2020 Census, together with the official estimates for mid 2021. The table also includes their administrative centres and the number of villages (rural desa and urban kelurahan) within each district, and its post code.

Notes: (a) Sirombu District includes the eleven offshore Hinako Islands. (b) except the village of Hayo, with a post code of 22867.

References 

Regencies of North Sumatra